The list of ship launches in 1744 includes a chronological list of some ships launched in 1744.


References

1744
Ship launches